The Championnat de France National, commonly referred to as simply National or Division 3, serves as the third division of the French football league system behind Ligue 1 and Ligue 2. Contested by 18 clubs, the Championnat National operates on a system of promotion and relegation with Ligue 2 and the Championnat National 2, the fourth division of French football.

Seasons run from August to May, with teams playing 34 games each, totalling 306 games in the season. Most games are played on Fridays and Saturdays, with a few games played during weekday evenings. Play is regularly suspended the last weekend before Christmas for two weeks before returning in the second week of January.

The National was founded in 1993 by the French Football Federation and served as a base league for clubs on the brink of becoming professional or falling to the amateur levels. The league is annually composed of professional and semi-professional clubs. The matches in the league attract on average between 2,500 and 6,000 spectators per match.

Competition format
There are 18 clubs in the Championnat National. During the course of a season, usually from August to May, each club plays the others twice, once at their home stadium and once at that of their opponents, for a total of 34 games. Teams receive three points for a win and one point for a draw. No points are awarded for a loss. Teams are ranked by total points, then goal difference, and then goals scored. At the end of each season, the club with the most points is crowned champion and promoted to Ligue 2. If points are equal, the goal difference and then goals scored determine the winner. If still equal, teams are deemed to occupy the same position. If there is a tie for the championship or for relegation, a play-off match at a neutral venue decides rank. The second and third-place finisher are also promoted to the second division, while the four lowest placed teams are relegated to the Championnat National 2 and the four winners of the four groups from Championnat National 2 are promoted in their place.

Current clubs
For the 2022–23 season.

Stadia and locations

Championnat National table of honours

References

External links

Official Site 

 
3
Sports leagues established in 1993
1993 establishments in France
Fran
Professional sports leagues in France